Jan Van Hanswijk (fl. late 16th century) was a Flemish surveyor and cartographer, best known for making a map of the city of Mechelen, completed in the last quarter of the 16th century. His map is the second oldest preserved city map of Mechelen. Differently from Jacob van Deventer, who had made an earlier map, he depicted all important city buildings in his own map. After two centuries the map was in such a bad state that the Count of Coloma commissioned a copy from Jan Baptist De Noter.

References

Year of birth unknown
Year of death unknown
16th-century births
16th-century cartographers
16th-century Flemish cartographers
People from Mechelen